The 1942 Little All-America college football team is composed of college football players from small colleges and universities who were selected by the Associated Press (AP) as the best players at each position. For 1942, the AP selected first, second, and third teams.

Due to the impact of World War II, the AP did not pick another Little All-America team until 1945.

First team
Back - Virgil Wagner, Millikin
Back - Rudy Mobley, Hardin-Simmons
Back - Jimmy Jones, Union (TN)
Back - Vince Pacewic, Loyola of Los Angeles
End - Adrian Hasse, Amherst
End - Aubrey Faust, Wofford
Tackle - John Sanchez, San Francisco
Tackle - Joe Kiernan, Rockhurst
Guard - Hugh Bogovich, Delaware
Guard - Warren Schmakel, Central Michigan
Center - Vincent Zachem, Morehead Teachers

Second team
Back - Dwight Holshouser, Catawba
Back - Jackie Fellows, Fresno State
Back - Bill Schmidt, Williams
Back - Pete Gorgone, Muhlenberg
End - Ray Sandvig, Augustana (SD)
End - Bob Stokes, Howard Payne
Tackle - T. J. Campion, Southeast Louisiana
Tackle - George Gagliardi, Miami (FL)
Guard - Doyle Caraway, Texas Tech
Guard - Larry Visnic, St. Benedict's
Center - Ed Bolduc, Washburn

Third team
Back - Del Huntsinger, Portland (OR)
Back - Eddie McGovern, Rose Poly
Back - Bob Ruman, Arizona
Back - Art Jones, Haverford
End - Emil Lussow, Dubuque
End - Murray Hanna, Alma
Tackle - Paul Newell, Kearney Teachers
Tackle - Gregory Thomas, Rochester
Guard - Pershing Scott, Rollins
Guard - Gene Volpi, Colorado Mines
Center - E.W. Grubbs, Sam Houston

See also
 1942 College Football All-America Team

References

Little All-America college football team
Little All-America college football teams